Cirillo is the Italian form of the name "Cyril". It is derived , .

The standard botanical author abbreviation "Cirillo" refers to Domenico Cirillo.

Given name 
 Cirillo Manicardi (9 December 1856 – 27 May 1925), Italian painter
 Cirillo "Nello" Pagani (11 October 1911 – 19 October 2003), Italian motorcycle racer and Formula 1 driver

Surname 
 Domenico Cirillo or "Cyrillo" (10 April 1739 – 9 October 1799), Italian physician and patriot

Crime 
 Ciro Cirillo (15 February 1921 – 30 July 2017), Italian politician kidnapped by the Red Brigades
 Dominick Cirillo (born 4 July 1929), "Quiet Dom", member of the Genovese crime family
 Nathan Cirillo (23 December 1989 – 22 October 2014), Canadian soldier shot at Parliament Hill, Ottawa

Religion 
 Bernardino Cirillo (20 May 1500 – 19 June 1575), Roman Catholic Archbishop of Loreto, Italy
 Cyrillus Jarre (born Rudolf Jarre, 2 February 1878 – 8 March 1952), Franciscan Archbishop in Jinan, China, also known as Cirillo Rudolfus Jarre

Sports 
 Bruno Cirillo (born 21 March 1977), Italian centre back footballer for FC Pune City
 Damián Cirillo (born 17 January 1980), Argentine footballer for Club Sol de América
 Gennaro Cirillo (born 2 September 1961), Italian sprint canoer and 1988 Olympian
 Gustavo Cirillo (born 23 April 1961), Argentine sprint canoer and 1984 Olympian
 Jeff Cirillo (born 23 September 1960), American third baseman in Major League Baseball

Surnames